Kasingirima is an administrative ward in Kigoma-Ujiji District of Kigoma Region in Tanzania. 
In 2016 the Tanzania National Bureau of Statistics report there were 3,156 people in the ward, from 2,867 in 2012.

Villages / neighborhoods 
The ward has 4 neighborhoods.
 Livingstone
 Matofalini
 Kasuki
 Mgombewa

References

Wards of Kigoma Region